Prince Malik Ado-Ibrahim  (born 22 December 1960) is a Nigerian businessman and politician. In 1999 at the age of 38, he became the first black team co-owner of Arrows, the consortium that controlled 70% of the shares of Formula One. He is the third son of the Ohinoyi of Ebiraland, Ado Ibrahim. He was educated in England and the USA. He is the YPP presidential candidate in Nigeria's 2023 presidential election.

Personal life
In 2020, Ibrahim reportedly married Adama Indimi, daughter of a Nigerian billionaire and philanthropist, Mohammed Indimi.

Political career
In June 2022, Ibrahim became the presidential flag bearer of the Young People's Party (YPP) against the 2023 Nigerian elections by polling over 66 votes, defeating closest opponent, Ruby Issac, who polled 4 votes. 

He, however, was not successful in winning the presidential election in the February 25, 2023, presidential polls.

References

Living people
1960 births
People from Kogi State
Ebira people
 Nigerian politicians
Nigerian businesspeople
Nigerian royalty